Ekrem Memnun (born 16 July 1969) is a Turkish basketball Head coach. He is the current head coach of Çukurova Basketbol of the Women's Basketball Super League.

Coaching career
Ekrem Memnun started his coaching career in the Galatasaray youth team in 1988. After serving as assistant coach of women's team and in charge of infrastructure, Memnun took over Yıldırım Spor in 1992 and stayed there for three years.

In 1995, he returned to the Galatasaray Men's Basketball Team as assistant coach and became the head coach of Galatasaray women's basketball team between 1996 and 2002, and in the 1998-1999 season, he and his team won the third place in the Euroleague, one of the greatest achievements in women's basketball up to that date. During this time, three Turkish League (1996-1997, 1997-1998, 1999-2000) three President Cup (1996, 1997, 1998) and two in Turkey Cup (1997, 1998) was the head of the winning team.

Working as assistant coach in the Galatasaray Men's Basketball Team under the management of Erman Kunter in 2002, Memnun became the head coach of the Kosovo team Sigal Prishtina in 2003, where he was the regular season leader, a Kosovo Cup, a Kosovo National Cup and a Kosovo Super The trophy saw successes.

Efes Pilsen (2005–2008)
In 2005, he again returned to Turkey to become the assistant coach of Efes Pilsen coach Oktay Mahmuti, he continued in this position for three seasons.

Darüşşafaka Cooper Tires (2008–2010)
He became the head coach of Darüşşafaka Cooper Tires in 2008 and stayed there for two seasons.

Galatasaray (women) (2012–2016)
Ekrem Memnun, who started running the Galatasaray Odeabank Women's Basketball Team on June 13, 2012, beat Fenerbahçe 3-2 in the league and reached the championship after 14 years. On April 13, 2014, she won the championship by overthrowing the arch-rival Fenerbahçe in the Euroleague Women final, and women achieved the greatest success in basketball history on the basis of clubs. Having brought Galatasaray Odebank to the top of the league and Europe, Memnun completed the 2013-14 season with 3 trophies with the victory of the Presidential Cup.

Turkey (women) (2015–2018)
February 10, 2015 he has started to coach National Women's Basketball Team, and it lasted in two different terms until December 10, 2018.

Galatasaray (men) (2021–2022)
On January 14, 2021, he has signed with Galatasaray, but it's his first opportunity for the head coach position.

Sigal Prishtina (2022)
On June 17, 2022, he has signed with KB Prishtina of the Kosovo Basketball Superleague.

References

1969 births
Living people
Basketbol Süper Ligi head coaches
Darüşşafaka Basketbol coaches
Galatasaray S.K. (men's basketball) coaches
Galatasaray S.K. (women's basketball) coaches
Turkish expatriate basketball people in Kosovo
Turkish women's basketball coaches